The 10th African Championships in Athletics were held in Yaoundé, Cameroon between 13 and 16 June 1996 at the Stade Ahmadou Ahidjo.

Medal summary

Men's events

Women's events

Medal table

External links
Results – GBR Athletics

African Championships in Athletics
International athletics competitions hosted by Cameroon
Sport in Yaoundé
African Championships
African
African Championships in Athletics
20th century in Yaoundé
Events in Yaoundé